The 1928 Stanley Cup Finals was a best-of-five series played entirely in Montreal between the New York Rangers and the Montreal Maroons. It was the first appearance by the Rangers in the Finals in only their second season. This was also the first of only two times that a Montreal-based team lost the clinching game of the Stanley Cup Finals at home in the Montreal Forum, the other occurred in  when the Calgary Flames defeated the Montreal Canadiens.

Paths to the Finals
The Montreal Maroons defeated the Ottawa Senators in the quarter-finals total-goals series 3–1. The Maroons then defeated the Montreal Canadiens in the semi-finals total-goals series 3–2 to reach the Finals.

The New York Rangers defeated the Pittsburgh Pirates in the quarter-finals total-goals series 6–4. The Rangers then defeated the Boston Bruins in the semi-finals total-goals series 5–2 to reach the Finals.

Game summaries
The series had to be played in Montreal, as the circus had taken over New York's Madison Square Garden.

The Rangers lost their goalie Lorne Chabot to an eye injury in the second period of game two. Although goaltenders Alex Connell and Hugh McCormick were in the stands, the Maroons refused to allow the Rangers to use either goalie. In one of the most famous incidents in hockey history, 44-year-old coach Lester Patrick took over with the recorded words "Boys, don't let an old man down," and his efforts inspired the Rangers to a 2–1 victory in overtime. At 44 years, 99 days old, Patrick became the oldest man to play in the Stanley Cup Finals, a record which remains unsurpassed to this day (Chris Chelios in 2008 at the age of 46 became the oldest player with his name on the cup, though he did not log any ice time in the final). He entered with eight minutes remaining in the second period and played the final 35:05 of the game.

For the following matches, the Rangers hired New York Americans goalie Joe Miller, who won two games including a shutout. Miller was available to all NHL teams as a backup after the Americans had put him on waivers. The Boston Bruins had claimed him on waivers, but he was made available to any NHL team. At the time of the Finals, Miller had not played in four weeks, and was home in Ottawa. Miller was cut and suffered two black eyes in game five, but hung on for a 2–1 victory.

Stanley Cup engraving
The 1928 Stanley Cup was presented to Rangers captain Bill Cook by NHL President Frank Calder following the Rangers 2–1 win over the Maroons in game five.

The following Rangers players and staff had their names engraved on the Stanley Cup

Frank Boucher became the fourth member of his family to win the Stanley Cup, after his brother George won it four times with Ottawa, and his brothers Billy and Bobby had won it with Montreal in 1924.

1927–28 New York Rangers

Three champions
With the Rangers' triumph, the city of New York became home of the titlists of all three major sports leagues, including the 1927 World Series-winning New York Yankees and the 1927 National Football League champion New York Giants (the Yankees won again in 1928, giving New York bragging rights over MLB, the NFL and NHL for almost 14 months, until the Providence Steamrollers clinched the NFL title in December of that year). The only other city to pull off this feat is Detroit, whose Tigers, Lions and Red Wings reigned over the pro sports scene in 1935.

See also
1927–28 NHL season

References

 Podnieks, Andrew; Hockey Hall of Fame (2004). Lord Stanley's Cup. Bolton, Ont.: Fenn Pub. pp 12, 50. 
 

Notes

Stanley Cup
Stanley Cup Finals
New York Rangers games
Stan
Stanley Cup Finals
Stanley Cup Finals
Stanley Cup Finals
Ice hockey competitions in Montreal
Stanley Cup Finals